Chester County may refer to:

 Chester County, Pennsylvania, United States
 Chester County, South Carolina, United States
 Chester County, Tennessee, United States
 Cheshire or the County Palatine of Chester, a ceremonial county in the North West of England, United Kingdom
 Cheshire County (disambiguation)